The Pages is an island group in the Australian state of South Australia consisting of two small islands and a reef located in Backstairs Passage, a strait separating Kangaroo Island and the Fleurieu Peninsula.  The island group has been located with the protected area known as The Pages Conservation Park since 1972.

Etymology
The islands were known to the indigenous Kaurna people as Metalong.
In Aboriginal lore the islands are those of two women that Nurunderi had saved, but who had subsequently eaten forbidden food and fled him. Nurunderi tracked them for days to the Fleurieu Peninsula where they tried to enter the spirit land, but Nurunderi chanted the song of the winds to raise the sea and sweep the women into the ocean. Nepelle then turned the women to stone and their petrified bodies remain as a warning to women to never eat forbidden food.

They were named “The Pages” by Matthew Flinders on 7 April 1802 from their fancied resemblance to pages guarding their strategic position at the eastern entrance to the strait.

Description
Geologically, The Pages are constituted of phyllites of the Brukunga Formation, formed from metamorphosed Cambrian sedimentary rocks. The islands are rugged; they contain no beaches and access by sea is difficult. There is a navigational aid on the top of South Page Island.

Flora and fauna
Small pockets of soil on the tops of the islands support patches of vegetation.  Recorded plants include variable groundsel, bulbine lily, round-leaved pigface, ruby saltbush and an Atriplex saltbush.  Silver gulls breed on the islands, which also support a breeding colony of Australian sea lions. A little penguin colony existed on the South Page island, with an estimated population of 200-400 birds in 1992. In 2009, the population had declined to "few". An account of the island's fauna from 1884 described little penguins as being "very plentiful" on the South Page island, and mentioned the nesting site of a large eagle which was discovered at an "almost inaccessible" location.

Protected area status
The Pages has enjoyed protected area status since 29 April 1909 starting with declaration as part of a Bird Protection District under the Birds Protection Act 1900 followed by declaration as a closed area under the Animals and Birds Protection Act 1919-1938 in 1955, proclamation as a Fauna Reserve under the Fauna Conservation Act 1964-1965 in 1966, proclamation as a Fauna Conservation Reserve under the Crown Lands Act 1929-1967 in 1967, and concluding with proclamation as The Pages Conservation Park following the enactment of the National Parks and Wildlife Act 1972 in 1972.

See also
List of islands of Australia
Page (disambiguation)

References

Islands of South Australia
Backstairs Passage